AIDA Cruises is a German cruise line founded in the early 1960s and organized as a wholly owned subsidiary of Carnival Corporation & plc since 2003. Based in Rostock, Germany, AIDA Cruises caters primarily to the German-speaking market; as seagoing "club resorts", AIDA ships have on-board amenities and facilities designed to attract younger, more active vacationers. As of January 2023, the cruise line operates 12 ships.

History 

The company was founded in 1952 as VEB Deutsche Seereederei Rostock (German Shipping Company Rostock) as the German Democratic Republic's state-owned shipping company, based at Rostock, and became VEB Deutfracht/Seereederei Rostock in 1973. It began its passenger operations with Völkerfreundschaft ("Peoples' Friendship"), in the 1960. After the reunification of Germany in the early 1990s Deutfracht/Seereederei Rostock was privatised and became Deutsche Seereederei Rostock GmbH. DSR acquired Seetours of Bremen and cruises were marketed under the Seetours brand. On 1 January 1998, DSR split their operations into cargo and tourism, with a new company Arkona Touristik taking over the cruise business. Then during 2000 a company was formed, known as AIDA Cruises; with P&O Cruises acquiring  a 51% stake in the new organisation, and Arkona Touristik  retaining the other 49%.

As subsidiary of Carnival Corporation & plc 
In 2001, P&O Princess Cruises acquired the remaining 49% interest in AIDA and the cruise business
associated with Seetours International. In 2003, P&O Princess merged with Carnival Corporation, to form Carnival Corporation & plc, the world's largest cruise holiday company. 
The Seetours cruise business, that had been acquired by P&O, was rebranded as AIDA Cruises in 2004.

Following the merger, executive control of AIDA Cruises was transferred to Costa Cruises Group, one of the main operating companies of Carnival Corporation & plc, with responsibility for the group's European brands. AIDA Cruises is now one of ten brands owned by Carnival Corporation & plc, based at Miami, Florida, accounting for 6.5% of its share of revenue and has been led by President Felix Eichhorn since 1 September 2015.

In October 2017,  departed from Hamburg on the company's first World Cruise. After a 116-day sailing, the ship returned to Hamburg on 10 February 2018. The ship visited Southampton, Lisbon, Madeira, Rio de Janeiro, Ushuaia, Easter Island, Tahiti, Singapore, and the Maldives, among other destinations. On 8 October 2018   left Hamburg on the company's second World Cruise, the  117-day voyage visited 41 ports in 20 countries on four continents. Several of the destinations were new to the company, including South Africa, Namibia, Melbourne, Tasmania, Fiji, Samoa and New Caledonia.

In December 2018, AIDA debuted AIDAnova, the first cruise ship to be fully powered by liquefied natural gas (LNG). Earlier, in May 2016, AIDAprima and AIDAsol had become the first two ships in the AIDA fleet to be simultaneously powered by LNG. In August 2019, AIDA signed an agreement with Corvus Energy to install battery storage systems for the electrification of their ships. In October 2019, AIDA announced that it would test a new fuel-cell technology for large-scale cruise ships aboard the AIDAnova as early as 2021.

Fleet

Current fleet

Former fleet

As Deutsche Seereederei/DSR/Arkona Touristik

As AIDA Cruises

References

External links

 

 
1960 establishments in East Germany
Carnival Corporation & plc
Companies based in Mecklenburg-Western Pomerania
Companies of East Germany
Cruise lines
Transport companies established in 1960